Ideluy, also rendered as Igdalu or Idehlu, may refer to various places in Iran:
 Ideluy-e Olya
 Ideluy-e Sofla